In mathematics, a dilation is a function  from a metric space  into itself that satisfies the identity

In Euclidean space, such a dilation is a similarity of the space. Dilations change the size but not the shape of an object or figure.

Every dilation of a Euclidean space that is not a congruence has a unique fixed point that is called the center of dilation.  Some congruences have fixed points and others do not.

See also
 Homothety 
 Dilation (operator theory)

References

Metric geometry